Luan David Capanni Dias (born 29 May 2000) is a Brazilian professional footballer who plays as an attacking midfielder and forward for I liga club Arka Gdynia.

Club career

Lazio
Capanni is a youth product of Corinthians and Flamengo, and signed for Lazio in 2018 on a one-year contract. Capanni made his professional debut with Lazio in a 3-1 Serie A loss to Torino on 26 May 2019, replacing Ștefan Radu on 83rd minute.

AC Milan
On 20 August 2019, Capanni signed for AC Milan on a free transfer.

On 30 January 2020, Milan loaned him to Spanish Segunda División B club Racing Santander

On 29 July 2021, he joined Viterbese on loan until 30 June 2022. On 23 January 2022, he moved on another loan to Grosseto.

On 20 July 2022, Capanni joined Estrela da Amadora in Portugal.

Arka Gdynia
On 16 December 2022, he left AC Milan permanently to join Polish I liga club Arka Gdynia, signing a deal until June 2025.

Personal life
Capanni was born in Brazil and is of Italian descent holding dual nationality, and expressed an interest in representing the Italy national football team.

References

External links
 
 
 Gazzetta Profile
 Lega Serie A Profile

Living people
2000 births
Footballers from São Paulo
Brazilian people of Italian descent
Brazilian footballers
Association football forwards
Serie A players
Serie C players
Segunda División B players
Liga Portugal 2 players

S.S. Lazio players
A.C. Milan players
U.S. Viterbese 1908 players
F.C. Grosseto S.S.D. players
Racing de Santander players
C.F. Estrela da Amadora players
Arka Gdynia players
Brazilian expatriate footballers
Expatriate footballers in Italy
Brazilian expatriate sportspeople in Italy
Expatriate footballers in Spain
Brazilian expatriate sportspeople in Spain
Expatriate footballers in Portugal
Brazilian expatriate sportspeople in Portugal
Expatriate footballers in Poland
Brazilian expatriate sportspeople in Poland